Sant Hirdaram Nagar (Station Code: SHRN) is a railway station in Bhopal, the capital of Madhya Pradesh. It is operated by West Central Railway from February 1, 2018. Previously the station was named "Bairagarh(BIH)" and was operated under Ratlam Division of Western Railway.

Development
The renovation of Sant Hirdaram Nagar station was completed in 2021 by the West Central Railway zone of Indian Railways. In the same year, coach guidance systems which display the code and coach number of an oncoming train were installed on the station, thus upgrading facilities. 
Recently, a proposal to upgrade the waiting hall for passengers, due to the increased footfall was made.

References

Railway stations in Bhopal district
Railway stations in Bhopal
Bhopal railway division
Transport in Bhopal
Year of establishment missing